Élton José Xavier Gomes (born 7 April 1986), known as Élton Arábia or just Élton, is a Brazilian footballer who currently plays as a left midfielder or attacking midfielder.

Club career

Steaua București
Élton Arábia was bought by Romanian side Steaua București at the age of 21. Even though his spell with the Romanian team was short, his impact was immediate. He scored in his first match against FC Argeş Piteşti and had great performances in the next games. In a 2009 poll, he was chosen by the Steaua Bucharest fans in the team's Best XI for the past ten years. Steaua Bucharest's Executive President Mihai Stoica has always expressed his amazement for the incredible technique and dribbling tricks Arábia is capable of.

Al Nassr
In 2007, he moved to Saudi side Al Nassr where he scored frequently and provided many assists. He was loved and cherished by the Al Nasr fans who found him unique due to his quick pace and dribbling. The most distinctive thing about the player, which all fans copied by wearing wigs, was his long afro hair.

Return to Brazil
In 2009, Arábia moved to Fortaleza Esporte Clube back in Brazil.

Emarati club
At the end of 2009, Arábia moved to Dubai Club where he contributed to the team's winning of the Federation Cup. In February 2010, he was loaned to the UAE Giants Al Wasl for the rest of the 2009–10 season.

Return to Saudia
In the 2012–2013 season he played for Al Fateh in 25 league games and scored 11 goals, helping the team win the first title in the history of the club. He then played in the Saudi Super Cup against Al-Ittihad Jeddah, after 90 minutes the score was 2-2 and the game went into extra time. Arábia scored the winning goal of the game in the 111th minute, the final result was 3-2 for Al Fateh.

In 2017, Arábia moved to Saudi side Al-Qadisiyah, where he captains the team. However, during the winter transfer window, He moved to the western province and joined Al-Wehda Club.

Career statistics

Honours

Club
Corinthians
Campeonato Brasileiro Série A: 2005
Dubai Club
UAE Federation Cup: 2010
Al Fateh
Saudi Premier League: 2012–13
Saudi Super Cup: 2013

Notes

References

External links

1986 births
Living people
Brazilian footballers
Association football midfielders
Sport Club Corinthians Paulista players
Associação Desportiva São Caetano players
FC Steaua București players
Al Nassr FC players
Al-Rayyan SC players
Dubai CSC players
Al-Wasl F.C. players
Al-Fateh SC players
Mesaimeer SC players
Al-Qadsiah FC players
Clube de Regatas Brasil players
Al-Wehda Club (Mecca) players
Al Hamriyah Club players
Liga I players
Saudi Professional League players
UAE First Division League players
UAE Pro League players
Qatari Second Division players
Expatriate footballers in Romania
Expatriate footballers in Saudi Arabia
Expatriate footballers in Qatar
Expatriate footballers in the United Arab Emirates
Brazilian expatriate sportspeople in Romania
Brazilian expatriate sportspeople in Saudi Arabia
Brazilian expatriate sportspeople in Qatar
Brazilian expatriate sportspeople in the United Arab Emirates
Sportspeople from Alagoas